Ángel Martínez Ortega (born 17 May 1991) is a Spanish professional footballer who plays as a left-back for Singapore Premier League club DPMM FC.

Club career
Born in Barcelona, Catalonia, Martínez finished his development at RCD Espanyol. He made his senior debut for their reserves on 30 August 2009, starting in a 0–0 Segunda División B home draw against Sporting Mahonés CF.

On 20 August 2010, Martínez was loaned to Real Jaén of the same league for one season. On 12 July of the following year he signed for another reserve team, Deportivo Fabril in the Tercera División.

Martínez returned to the third division on 1 August 2013, joining CD Guijuelo. He continued to compete at that level the following years, representing Espanyol B and CF Reus Deportiu. He achieved promotion to Segunda División with the latter side, appearing in 32 matches in the process.

Martínez made his professional debut on 27 August 2016, starting in a 1–1 home draw with CD Mirandés. The following 13 June, he agreed to a two-year deal with Real Zaragoza also from the second tier.

On 4 July 2018, Martínez moved abroad for the first time in his career, signing a two-year contract with Super League Greece club Asteras Tripolis FC. He scored his first goal for them on 25 September in a 2–1 home win over Apollon Smyrnis F.C. in the group phase of the Greek Cup, adding another in the round of 16 against Athlitiki Enosi Larissa F.C. to help the hosts to win 5–3 and qualify 7–6 on aggregate.

On 17 August 2020, Martínez agreed to a deal at FC Viitorul Constanța of the Romanian Liga I. On 28 December, he was released by mutual consent.

Martínez continued playing abroad the following seasons, with PAS Lamia 1964 (Greek top flight) and DPMM FC (Singapore Premier League).

International career
Martínez played for Spain in the 2008 UEFA European Under-17 Championship, scoring in the semi-final and helping his country to win the tournament.

Career statistics

Honours
Spain U17
UEFA European Under-17 Championship: 2008

References

External links

1991 births
Living people
Spanish footballers
Footballers from Barcelona
Association football defenders
Segunda División players
Segunda División B players
Tercera División players
CF Damm players
RCD Espanyol B footballers
Real Jaén footballers
Deportivo Fabril players
CD Guijuelo footballers
CF Reus Deportiu players
Real Zaragoza players
Super League Greece players
Asteras Tripolis F.C. players
PAS Lamia 1964 players
Liga I players
FC Viitorul Constanța players
Singapore Premier League players
DPMM FC players
Spain youth international footballers
Spanish expatriate footballers
Expatriate footballers in Greece
Expatriate footballers in Romania
Expatriate footballers in Brunei
Spanish expatriate sportspeople in Greece
Spanish expatriate sportspeople in Romania